No olvidarás mi nombre is a Colombian telenovela produced by Fernando Gaitán and written by Nubia Barreto for RCN Televisión. The series is starring Iván López as Sergio Aparicio, leading female role by Susana Rojas as Lucía Martinez and the return to television of Ana María Orozco.

Plot 
The series is a production based on real events and tells the story of Sergio Aparicio, a brilliant Bogota brokerage executive, who, at the end of an equine fair, meets a mysterious woman: Lucía Martínez. Both are in the place for different reasons, he to make money, and she, to talk with Monica Zapata about the real origin of the child Monica considers her son.

Cast 
 Iván López as Sergio Aparicio
 Susana Rojas as Lucía Martínez
 Ana María Orozco as Mónica Zapata
 Jairo Camargo as Leonardo Zapata
 Carmenza Gómez as Carmen Mojica
 Alina Lozano as Victoria Mera
 Michelle Rouillard as Miranda Londoño
 Ana Harlem Mosquera as Nieves Torres
 Hernán Méndez as Father Hipólito Castillo
 Andrés Toro as Martín Zapata
 Paula Estrada as Violeta Cortés
 Ricardo Mejía as Climaco Solano
 Laura Hernández as Beatriz Cadena
 Wildderman García as Ezequiel Martínez
 Mauricio Puentes as Abel Cadena
 Jorge Soto as César Palacios

Colombia rating

References 

Colombian telenovelas
Spanish-language telenovelas
RCN Televisión telenovelas
2017 telenovelas
2017 Colombian television series debuts
2017 Colombian television series endings
Television shows set in Bogotá